Khoroshiv, until 2015 Volodarsk-Volynskyi (translit. Volodarsk-Volynskyi) is an urban-type settlement in Zhytomyr Raion, Zhytomyr Oblast, Ukraine. Population:

History
The settlement was first mentioned in 1545 as Oleksandropil. It was owned by szlachcic Alexander Pronsky, and after his death was inherited by the Polish Leszczynski family. In 1525, the town, then called Horoshky, was sold to Nemyrych family. During the Khmelnytsky Uprising Horoshky belonged to Kyiv Regiment, but in 1667 were returned to Poland according to the Treaty of Andrusovo. In 1685-1699 the town was once again controlled by Ukrainian Cossacks under the leadership of Semen Paliy.After the Second Partition of Poland Horoshky became part of the Russian Empire. In 1796, Empress Catherine II confiscated the local manor from its Polish owners and awarded it to field marshal Mikhail Kutuzov. To commemorate this fact, in 1912 the imperial authorities renamed Horoshky to Kutuzove. In 1917, the town became part of the Ukrainian People's Republic, but in 1921 was finally occupied by the Red Army and renamed to Volodarsk (since 1927 - Volodarsk-Volynsky), after the Bolshevik politician V.Volodarsky. After Ukraine regained independence, the settlement was finally renamed to Khoroshiv in 2016, as part of the decommunization campaign.

Points of interest
 17th century fortification walls.
 Catholic Church of Transfiguration.
 Male Orthodox monastery of Saint Paisius.
 Orthodox and Protestant churches.
 Kutuzov park.
 Museum of valuable and decorative stones.
 Monument to Taras Shevchenko.

Notable personalities
 Yuri Nemyrych - politician and aristocrat of the Polish-Lithuanian Commonwealth, owned the settlement in the 17th century.
 Oleksandr Dovzhenko - Ukrainian Soviet filmmaker, worked as a teacher in a local school in 1914.

References

Urban-type settlements in Zhytomyr Raion
Zhytomyr Raion
Zhitomirsky Uyezd